Niankhba was an ancient Egyptian official from the end of the Fifth Dynasty, in office under king Unas. Niankhba was vizier and was therefore the most important official at the royal court. Niankhba is known from his mastaba next to the pyramid of king Unas. The mastaba was found heavily destroyed. His name and titles are only known from the inscriptions found in the burial chamber. The walls of the burial chamber were decorated. The sarcophagus in the burial chamber was inscribed.

References

Literature 

Viziers of the Fifth Dynasty of Egypt